Temnostoma apiforme is a species of hoverfly. Larva of this species feed in decaying wood of deciduous trees.

References

Diptera of Europe
Eristalinae
Insects described in 1794
Taxa named by Johan Christian Fabricius